Jeffrey Allan Chadwick (born December 16, 1960), is a former professional American football player. A 6'3", 185-lb. wide receiver from Grand Valley State University, Chadwick was never drafted by a National Football League team, but did play in 126 games over 10 NFL seasons from 1983 to 1992 for the Detroit Lions, the Seattle Seahawks, and the Los Angeles Rams, catching a career total of 4549 yards and 27 touchdowns. 

Chadwick attended Divine Child High School in Dearborn, Michigan before attending Grand Valley State, where he competed in track and field as well as football from 1979 to 1982.  In 1993 he was admitted to Grand Valley's hall of fame.
Jeff is currently residing in Clare, MI. Jeff also runs his football camp, Legends of Football camp.

References

1960 births
American football wide receivers
Detroit Lions players
Grand Valley State Lakers football players
Living people
Los Angeles Rams players
Players of American football from Detroit
Seattle Seahawks players
Sportspeople from Dearborn, Michigan